Bousquel is a rural settlement in the Chardonnières commune in the Chardonnières Arrondissement, in the Sud department of Haiti.

References

Populated places in Sud (department)